Klausen-Leopoldsdorf a town in the district of Baden in Lower Austria in Austria.

Population

References

External links 

Cities and towns in Baden District, Austria